Fagus longipetiolata is a beech tree species in the family Fagaceae.

References

longipetala
Vulnerable plants
Trees of China
Trees of Vietnam
Taxonomy articles created by Polbot